The list of railway stations in Baden-Württemberg contains all stations in Baden-Württemberg that are currently served by long-distance passenger transport or regional transport.

Legend
The list is set out as follows:
 Number: the stations below are all operated by Deutsche Bahn, the numbers listed are last four digits of the Internationale Bahnhofsnummer ("international station number", IBNR).
 Station: The current name of the station according to the official DB list of station abbreviations.
 Cat.: the current station category as at 1 January 2012.
 LD: station served by long-distance services (Intercity-Express, EuroCity-Express, Eurocity, Intercity)
 R: station served by regional services (Interregio-Express, Regional-Express, Regionalbahn, private railways)
 S: station served by S-Bahn services 
 Pl.: the number of platform tracks
 Municipality: this is the municipality where the station is located.
 Type: the official classification of the station, Bahnhof (Bf, "station"), Bahnhofsteil (Bft, "station precinct") or Haltepunkt (Hp, "halt").
 Line: the line that the station is located on.

Stations

Notes

See also

List of scheduled railway routes in Germany

 
Baden-Wurttemberg
Rail